Craig Goldman (born October 3, 1968) is an American politician. He serves as a Republican member for the 97th district of the Texas House of Representatives.

Born in Fort Worth, Texas. Goldman attended the University of Texas at Austin, where he earned his Bachelor of Arts degree. In 2013, he was elected for the 97th district of the Texas House of Representatives, succeeding Mark M. Shelton. Goldman assumed his office on January 8, 2013. He worked as a real estate businessman in Fort Worth. He is Jewish.

References 

1963 births
20th-century American Jews
21st-century American Jews
21st-century American politicians
American Jews
Businesspeople from Texas
Living people
Politicians from Fort Worth, Texas
Republican Party members of the Texas House of Representatives
University of Texas at Austin alumni